Frank M. Snowden Jr. (July 17, 1911February 18, 2007), was an American historian and classicist, best known for his study of black people in classical antiquity.  He was a Distinguished Professor  emeritus of classics at Howard University.

Career
Snowden was born in rural York County, Virginia, on July 17, 1911, but raised in Boston.  He graduated from Boston Latin School and earned undergraduate and doctoral degrees from Harvard University, completing his doctoral degree in 1944.  His thesis was titled De Servis Libertisque Pompeianis.

After a brief period teaching at Virginia State College and at Spelman College, Snowden moved to Howard University, where he remained the rest of his career.  At Howard, he served as chair of the classics department for many years, and was dean of the College of Liberal Arts from 1956 to 1968.

Snowden retired in 1976. In retirement, he taught at Howard as professor emeritus; he also taught at   Vassar College, and Mary Washington College. He was dean of the College of Liberal Arts at Howard University, and was the first honoree in the Howard University Libraries' "Excellence at Howard" program.

Snowden's books include Blacks in Antiquity: Ethiopians in the Greco-Roman Experience (1970), which received the Charles J. Goodwin Award of Merit of the American Philological Association, and Before Color Prejudice: The Ancient View of Blacks (1983).  He was also a contributor to The Image of the Black in Western Art I: From the Pharaohs to the Fall of the Roman Empire (1976).

Snowden served as a member of the American delegation to UNESCO in Paris, France.  He also served as a cultural attaché to the United States Embassy in Rome, Italy in the Eisenhower administration, and as a specialist lecturer for the U.S. State Department.

Work
Snowden was largely known for his studies of black people in the ancient world. He documented that in ancient Rome and Greece racial prejudice was not an issue. Much of this, according to Snowden, is because most of the Africans encountered in Rome were not slaves. Most of the Africans documented in Rome and Greece met were warriors, statesmen, and mercenaries. Therefore, Africans were not subjected to the racism of modern civilization. He studied ancient art and literature, and he found mass evidence Africans were able to co-exist with the Greeks and Romans of the time.

Later life and death
In 2003, Snowden was honored at the White House as a recipient of the National Humanities Medal. He died of congestive heart failure in Washington, D.C., on February 18, 2007.

Personal life
Snowden married Elaine Hill Snowden in 1935, and lived with her in Washington, D.C. until her death in 2005. He was fluent in Latin, Greek, German, French and Italian. His son, Frank M. Snowden III, is a professor of twentieth century Italian history at Yale University.

Works

References

External links

 
 

1911 births
2007 deaths
African-American academics
American diplomats
Georgetown University faculty
Harvard University alumni
Harvard University faculty
National Humanities Medal recipients
People from Fredericksburg, Virginia
University of Mary Washington faculty
Vassar College faculty
American classical scholars
20th-century American male writers
Academics from Virginia
Boston Latin School alumni
20th-century American writers
20th-century African-American writers
21st-century African-American people
African-American male writers